The following is a timeline of the presidency of Joe Biden during the first quarter of 2023, from January 1 to March 31, 2023. To navigate between quarters, see timeline of the Joe Biden presidency.

Timeline

January 2023

February 2023

March 2023

See also
 Presidential transition of Joe Biden
 List of executive actions by Joe Biden
 List of presidential trips made by Joe Biden (international trips)
 Timeline of the 2020 United States presidential election

Notes

References

2023 Q1
Presidency of Joe Biden
January 2023 events in the United States
February 2023 events in the United States
March 2023 events in the United States
Political timelines of the 2020s by year
2023 timelines